Shyqri Nimani (born 1941 in Shkodër, Albania) is an Albanian graphic designer and professor. Known as one of the first professional Albanian graphic designers, he is also one of the founders of the Graphic Design department at the Faculty of Arts, University of Pristina.
Graduated from the Academy of Applied Arts in Belgrade in 1967, from the bookcraft section. Postgraduated two years later 1969 at the same university and continued art research in Japan in the period 1976–1978. Among his best known works are: Grand Hotel logo, University of Prishtina symbol, "117" movie poster, Kosova/UNMIK first stamps, Kosova Film logo, Jesenin book layout and illustration.

Other work
Besides graphic design Nimani has worked in fields such as illustration, music and haiku poetry. He has translated "100 Haiku" from Japanese to Albanian. Nimani is also known to be the calligrapher of the Kosovo's Declaration of Independence document that was signed in 2008.

See also
 Albanian art
 Modern Albanian art

References

External links
 Ars Albanica
 Albanian Arts
 World Haiku

Albanian graphic designers
People from Shkodër
1941 births
Living people